152nd Division or 152nd Infantry Division may refer to:

 152nd Infantry Division (France)
 152nd Division (Imperial Japanese Army)
 Italian 152nd Garrison Division
 152nd Division (People's Republic of China)